Fichtenhöhe is a municipality in the district of Märkisch-Oderland in Brandenburg, Germany.

Demography

References

External links

Localities in Märkisch-Oderland